The CAP 540 is a French trailerable sailboat as a day sailer and fishing vessel. It was first built in 1986.

Production
The design was built by Jeanneau in France, starting in 1986, but it is now out of production.

Design
The CAP 540 is a recreational keelboat, built predominantly of fiberglass, with wood trim. It has a fractional sloop rig. The hull has a raked stem, a slightly angled transom, a transom-hung rudder controlled by a tiller and a fixed long keel. It displaces .

See also
List of sailing boat types

References

External links

Photo of a CAP 540

Keelboats
1980s sailboat type designs
Sailing yachts
Trailer sailers
Sailboat types built by Jeanneau